Kelly Township is a township in Carter County, in the U.S. state of Missouri.

References

Townships in Missouri
Townships in Carter County, Missouri